The following Union Army units and commanders fought in the Battle of Monocacy of the American Civil War. The Confederate order of battle is shown separately.

Abbreviations used

Military rank
 MG = Major General
 BG = Brigadier General
 Col = Colonel
 Ltc = Lieutenant Colonel
 Maj = Major
 Cpt = Captain

Other
 w = wounded

VIII Corps (detachment)
MG Lewis Wallace

VI Corps (detachment)

References
 Leepson, Marc. Desperate Engagement: How a Little-Known Civil War Battle Saved Washington, D.C., and Changed the Course of American History (New York: Thomas Dunne Books), 2007. 
 Monacacy National Battlefield website
 Composition and losses of the Union Forces at the Battle of Monocacy. The War of the Rebellion: A Compilation of the Official Records of the Union and Confederate Armies. United States War Department.  Volume XXXVII, Chapter 49, pp. 201–203

American Civil War orders of battle
Valley campaigns of 1864